Rudra Pratap Singh  (born 6 January 1965) is an Indian former cricketer who played 59 first-class matches between 1982 and 1996 for Uttar Pradesh and English county sides. A left-arm medium pace bowler and right-handed batsman, Singh represented India in two one-day international matches, both against Australia in 1986, picking up the wicket of Dean Jones, his only international scalp.

In late 1990s, Singh moved to England and took up coaching assignments with Lancashire county club and ECB.

Singh's son, Harry Singh, is an opening batsman who has been selected for the 2022 England under-19 team to play against Sri Lanka under-19.

References

External links
 

India One Day International cricketers
Indian cricketers
Uttar Pradesh cricketers
Central Zone cricketers
1965 births
Living people
Cricketers from Lucknow